The Centre for Human Rights and Rehabilitation, or CHRR, is a human rights non-governmental organisation in Malawi. It was founded in February 1995 as a non-profit, apolitical, voluntary organization registered under the Trustees Incorporation Act of 1962. The organization was founded by former students exiles who returned home to the promises of a new democracy in 1994.

The organization is authorized to provide its services anywhere in Malawi. Its registration under Incorporation Act 1962 provides the basis that defines the organization's mandate and scope of work. Currently programmes are carried out in all the three regions namely Southern, Central and Northern Regions.

The organization supports and promotes a vibrant Malawian culture which embraces values of democracy and human rights. CHRR mission is to contribute towards the protection, promotion and consolidation of good governance by empowering rural and urban communities in Malawi to increase awareness of and exercise their rights through research, education, advocacy and networking in order to realize human development.

CHRR seeks to contribute towards the realization of this mission through a number of programmes carried out through two core programmes namely: Community Mobilization and Empowerment and Human Rights Monitoring and Training.

History
The following information is from CHRR director Undule Mwakasungura unless otherwise indicated.

The Centre for Human Rights and Rehabilitation (CHRR) was founded in 1994. The group was founded by exiled students who left the country in the early 70s and 80s. They resumed life in other countries as business men and various professions. They returned in 1994 upon the introduction of multi party elections. The group decided to use their experience and expertise to promote the protection of human rights. The only remaining member of the founding group is current executive director Undule Mwakasungura.

Organization Overview

Mission Statement
Contribute towards the protection, promotion and consolidation of good governance byempowering rural and urban communities in Malawi to increase awareness of and exercise their rights through research, education, advocacy and networking in order to realize human development.

Objectives
-Raising awareness and understanding of human rights, democracy, and good governance among Malawians 
-Enhancing community awareness of safety issues
-Acquiring information that is of national importance
-Providing mediation to marginalized groups in Malawi 
-Lobbying for the repeal of laws that infringe on the rights of men, women, and children of Malawi. 
-Networking with other organizations with similar objectives on a national, regional, and international level.

Programs
•Community Mobilization and Empowerment
•Human Rights Monitoring and Training.

Major Challenges CHRR faces
1.) Sustainability in terms of financial support
2.) Duplication and Competition amongst local and international organizations 
3.) Negative government attitude towards NGOs 
4.) Staff turnover due to competition between NGOs 
5.) Widespread illiteracy and ignorance among the population has contributed to the lack of appreciation and understanding of human rights and democracy.

Background on Malawi
 
The following information comes from the CIA world fact book. 
Capital: Lilongwe
Population: 13,603,181 (2007 est.)
GDP per capita: $800 (2007 est.)
Type of Government: Multiparty democracy
History of current leader: Malawi, established in 1891, gained its independence from Britain in 1964. It held its first multi party election in 1994, after three decades of rule under President Hastings Kamuzu. President Bingu wa Mutharika, who was elected in May 2004, currently holds the position. He formed his own party called the Democratic Progressive Party (DPP).

Malawi has seen some economic improvement, but because of a political deadlock in the legislature, Mutharika has been unable to pass significant legislation. This has stalled the fight against corruption. 

Legal System: based on English common law, judicial review of legislative acts in the Supreme Court of appeal.

Challenges Malawi is facing
(following information from CHRR )
1.) Lack of constitutionalism 
2.) Lack of Respect for court rulings
3.) Lack of Political Parties (many groups are under represented. Women are not given leadership positions)
4.) Lack of Political Tolerance
5.) HIV and Aids

CHRR Achievements

CHRR has contributed to the promotion of human rights through programs like 
Civil Education: Bring awareness in communities through radio programs, community debates, training, and voter education. 
Research: CHRR has carried out research projects on issues related to governance, human rights, and other issues pertaining to governance and human rights. This research has been used as a tool for awareness and lobbying. 
Advocacy and Networking: CHRR has been in the forefront of advocacy for democratic governance. They have collaborated with organizations with similar interests. 

Some of the networks they are a part of include:
CONGOMA
HRCC
Gender Support Network
MEJN
MESN
Malawi Social Forum 
Amnesty International 

Some of their partners include: 
One World Africa	
Fahamu	Education Training
Centre For Children Affairs
Civil Liberties Committee
Christian Agency for Responsible Democracy and Unity	
Coalition on Violence Against Women	
Citizens for Justice
Foundation for Community Support Service

Specific examples of work
The following table gives specific case examples of work that CHRR has been involved in.

References

External links
  CHRR Advocates for Legislation to Curb Stigma Against HIV
  Tembo refuses to budge on Section 65
  Ben Travers reports on the anxieties about China’s rise in Africa, as Malawi ditches Taiwan for a new allegiance
   Govt urged to revive Compensation Tribunal

External links
www.chrr.org.mw official website

Human rights organisations based in Malawi